The Territory of Orleans was the name given to most of what is now the state of Louisiana (excluding that portion of the state which is west of the Sabine River). From 1806 until 1811, the Territory sent one non-voting Delegate (an "at-large" delegate) to the United States House of Representatives.

List of delegates representing the district

See also
 List of United States congressional districts

References
 

Territory of Orleans
Congressional delegations
Orleans Territory
Former congressional districts of the United States
At-large United States congressional districts